Super Shark is a 2011 science fiction action film directed by Fred Olen Ray and starring John Schneider, Sarah Lieving, and Tim Abell. The film follows a marine biologist named Kat Carmichael, played by Sarah Lieving, who has to investigate and survive the rampage of a mutated primordial shark.

Plot
Persistent exposure of ocean wildlife to a toxic goo used in oil drilling leads to a shark growing in size and becoming bulletproof, and even attaining the ability to move around on land. It destroys the oil rig that caused it, and then moves to Los Angeles where it eats several divers and threatens to disrupt a bikini contest.

Marine biologist Dr. Catherine Carmichael hires captain Chuck, a local drunk, to drive her out to the oil rig, owned by Traymore Industries, to investigate. Meanwhile, two female lifeguards plan to drink and have casual sex, and a kite surfer is eaten by the "super shark". Carmichael takes a water sample, then confronts the CEO of Traymore who invites her for drinks and dinner. When Carmichael interviews the sole survivor from the oil rig accident, it is disclosed that highly harmful chemicals were used to bore through the rock and that a shark pulled down the rig.

Meanwhile, Carmichael tells the CEO what she thinks happened: a "hydrolizing agent" caused the oil rig to crumble. Soon, a US Navy submarine disappears, and a search plane spots the super shark. At the bar, the two female lifeguards are joined by the male lifeguard, awaiting the bikini contest. Back out on the ocean, Carmichael and skipper Chuck are circled by the super shark until Carmichael, acting on a hunch, tells Chuck to turn off the radio, after which the super shark leaves. She speculates that the fish was attracted to radio waves and sent out signals which disturbed radio reception.

The bikini contest winner and the runner-up are eaten at the beach, together with the photographer, who had had the radio playing. The CEO reveals that he knows that Carmichael has been fired from her job for harassing oil company executives. He offers her a briefcase full of money if she'll go away; she accepts. Skipper Chuck finds her drunk in a bar; she tells him that she was fired, and that her brother died when the Exxon Valdez went down. She passes out and wakes up in Chuck's boat.

Carmichael and skipper Chuck get emotionally close, and seek contact with the military, which has invented a remote-controlled tank that can walk and jump. With the help of a boombox and external speaker, the super shark is lured to a beach, where the tank is unsuccessful in shooting it. Carmichael manages to drop a bomb made of C-4 explosives into the beast's mouth, and it is blown to pieces.

Cast
 Sarah Lieving as Kat Carmichael
 John Schneider as Roger Wade
 Tim Abell as Skipper Chuck
 Rick Cramer as Colonel Caldwell
 Trish Cook as Captain Marshall
 John L. Curtis as Brody
 Jimmie Walker as "Dynamite" Stevens
 Kylee Nash as Bikini Contestant

Release
The film was released on DVD on February 7, 2012.

Trivia 
The film was broadcast on Tele 5 as part of the programme format SchleFaZ in season 1.

See also
List of killer shark films

References

External links
 
 Super Shark at Rotten Tomatoes

2011 films
2010s English-language films
American science fiction action films
Films about sharks
2011 science fiction action films
2010s science fiction horror films
2011 horror films
Films about shark attacks
Giant monster films
CineTel Films films
Films directed by Fred Olen Ray
Syfy original films
2010s American films